Alburnoides maculatus is a species of small (7.3 cm max length) freshwater fish in the family Cyprinidae. It is endemic to the Crimea Peninsula.

References 

Alburnoides
Fish described in 1859